Vermont held its elections September 6, 1814. Voters swung from one party to the other.  The margins were close, actually, but to toss the entire six-member delegation out of office.

See also 
 List of United States representatives from Vermont
 United States House of Representatives elections, 1814 and 1815

1814
Vermont
United States House of Representatives